George Peters was Governor of the Bank of England from 1785 to 1787. He had been Deputy Governor from 1783 to 1785. He replaced Richard Neave as Governor and was succeeded by Edward Darell.

See also
Chief Cashier of the Bank of England

References

External links

Governors of the Bank of England
Year of birth missing
Year of death missing
British bankers
Deputy Governors of the Bank of England